Raghaujot is a village in Bahraich district, Uttar Pradesh, India. It has the population of 1,690 people.

References 

Villages in Bahraich district